United Nations Security Council resolution 660, adopted on 2 August 1990, after noting its alarm of the invasion of Kuwait by Iraq, the council condemned the invasion and demanded Iraq withdraw immediately and unconditionally to positions as they were on 1 August 1990.

Yemen called upon Iraq and Kuwait to enter into immediate negotiations to resolve their differences, thanking the Arab League for its efforts. Talks between both sides broke down the day before in Jeddah, Saudi Arabia. The council also decided to meet again as necessary to ensure compliance with the current resolution.

The resolution was adopted by 14 votes to none, while Yemen did not participate in voting. It was the first of twelve resolutions on the conflict passed in 1990.

See also
 Foreign relations of Iraq
 Gulf War
 Invasion of Kuwait
 Iraq–Kuwait relations
 List of United Nations Security Council Resolutions 601 to 700 (1987–1991)

References

External links
 
Text of the Resolution at undocs.org

 0660
 0660
Gulf War
1990 in Iraq
1990 in Kuwait
Iraq–Kuwait relations
 0660
August 1990 events